Emanoil Ionescu (17 March 1887 – 14 June 1949) was a Romanian General during World War II and commander of the Romanian Air Force's Corpul I Aerian.

Biography
He was born in 1887 in Tămpeni, now Movileni, Olt County. After attending the Military School for Officers, he graduated with the rank of second lieutenant in 1911. During World War I he served in the 43rd Infantry Regiment. He enrolled as a volunteer at the Aviation School in Botoșani and obtained his  pilot's license on July 11, 1918, after which he was assigned to the 4th Aviation Group. In the spring of 1919, when the Hungarian communist army attacked Romania, lieutenant Ionescu asked to be assigned to the 5th Aviation Group in Sibiu, an air subunit made available to General Gheorghe Mărdărescu, commander of the Romanian forces in Transylvania during the Hungarian–Romanian War. In April-June 1919 he carried out several combat missions aboard Sopwith 1½ Strutter aircraft, gathering information and bombing enemy targets.

Ionescu was promoted to captain in April 1920, and appointed squadron commander; the following year he was promoted to major, and given the command of an air group. From 1927 to 1929 he attended the Higher War School. In April 1937, he took command of the 3rd Fighter Wing, based in Galați, with the rank of captain-commander; half a year later, he was promoted to  commander. Between 1938 and 1939, Ionescu held the position of professor at the Higher War School and commander of the "Aurel Vlaicu" Military Aviation School in Bucharest. He was promoted to the rank of squadron general on May 10, 1941.

After Romania entered World War II on the side of the Axis on June 22, 1941, Ionescu commanded the air unit assigned to the Romanian 4th Army, and flew 40 hours in support of the crossings of rivers Prut and Dniester by the 4th Army. In September 1943 he became commander of the 1st Air Corps, the only large Romanian air unit on the Eastern Front.  After King Michael's Coup of August 23, 1944, when Romania switched sides to the Allies, Ionescu continued to command the Royal Romanian Air Force on the front lines in Transylvania, Hungary, and Czechoslovakia, providing air support to the Romanian 1st and 4th Armies. On March 10, 1945, he handed over the command to Air Squadron General Traian Burduloiu and returned to Bucharest, where he had been appointed Undersecretary of State for the Air Force.

He entered the reserve on January 1, 1948. A year and a half later, he died in Bucharest.  

In 2002, the RoAF 71st Air Base at Câmpia Turzii and the Fighter Wing-based there were named in his honor. A street in Slatina is also named in Ionescu's memory.

Awards
 Iron Cross (1939) 2nd and 1st Class
 Knight's Cross of the Iron Cross on 10 May 1944 as General de escadră and commanding general of the Royal Romanian 1st Air Corps
 Order of Michael the Brave 3rd Class (4 August 1945)
 Order of Suvorov 1st Class (9 August 1945)

References

19th-century births
1949 deaths
People from Olt County
Carol I National Defence University alumni
Romanian military personnel of World War I
Romanian people of the Hungarian–Romanian War
Romanian military personnel of World War II
Romanian Air Force generals
Recipients of the Order of Michael the Brave
Recipients of the Knight's Cross of the Iron Cross
Recipients of the Order of Suvorov, 1st class